Fawad Khan (born, 24 July 1984) is a Pakistani actor who appeared in television series, theater plays and web series. He is best known for his work in theatre. He made his on-screen debut in 2010 with Syed Mohammad Ahmed's Shaista Shaista that aired on TV One. Khan also appeared in Farjad Nabi and Meenu Gaur's Zeal for unity film Jeewan Hathi (2016).

Early life and career 
Khan completed his alma mater from National Academy of Performing Arts, Karachi in 2008. He made his television debut in 2010 with a supporting role in Syed Mohammad Ahmed's Shaista Shiasta. He then appeared in limited number of television series in supporting roles. He is majorly associated with theater where he works as a screenwriter, actor and director. His theatre play includes Khel Ek Raat Ka, Khoya Hua Aadmi and Dastaan Goi, which was widely appreciated.

Filmography

Film 
 Jeewan Hathi

Television

Web series

References 

Living people
1984 births
Pakistani male film actors
Pakistani male television actors
21st-century Pakistani male actors
Male actors in Urdu cinema
Male actors in Urdu television